Carlos Concha was a Peruvian football club, playing in the city of Callao, Lima, Peru in siecle XX, second middle.

History
The club Carlos Concha was founded on the Callao, Lima. The club was founded with the name of club Carlos Concha in honor to the Peruvian poet Carlos Concha Boy.

The club was the 1953, 1955 and 1963 Segunda Division Peruana champion.

Carlos Concha participated in the Peruvian Primera División in 1954, 1956, and 1964 and then in the first edition of Torneo Descentralizado in 1966.

Honours

National
Peruvian Segunda Division:
Winners (3): 1953, 1955, 1963
Runner-up (3): 1957, 1960, 1962

Regional
Liga Regional de Lima y Callao:
Winners (1): 1946

See also
List of football clubs in Peru
Peruvian football league system

External links
 Peru 2nd Division Champions (Lima)
 Peruvian First Division

Football clubs in Peru